The Austrian Postal Savings Bank building (German language: Österreichische Postsparkasse) is a famous building in Vienna, designed and built by the architect Otto Wagner. The building is regarded as an important work of Vienna Secession, branch of Art Nouveau.

It was constructed between 1904 and 1906 using then completely new reinforced concrete, and was opened on 17 December 1906. Extension was added between 1910 and 1912.

The building houses the headquarters of the Österreichische Postsparkasse (P.S.K.) bank, formerly the k.k. Postsparcassen-Amt (Imperial-Royal Postal Savings Office). It is located at Georg-Coch-Platz 2, in the first district Innere Stadt, next to the Ringstraße boulevard.

Exterior

Up to eight stories high, the building occupies an entire city block. The façade is covered with square marble slabs and aluminum applications reminiscent of a money storage. Granite slabs are attached to the lower and upper levels. The rivets with which the marble cladding seems to be fixed to the wall are purely ornamental and articulate the façade. Since the approximately 10 cm thick plates are kept in place by plaster, the rivets do not have supporting function. The use of marble makes the maintenance and cleaning of the facade very easy and inexpensive, important functional element in Wagner's design. Wagner greatly valued the aluminum, material perfected by Austrian chemist Carl Josef Bayer for industrial production. He used the material not only for the rivets, but also for other decorative elements on the outside and inside of the building, such as the portico columns and the central heating fans. The 4.3 meters high sculptures, for the first time made of cast aluminum and located on the attica of the building are work of Wagner long time collaborator Othmar Schimkowitz. The glass windows are partly a work of Leopold Forstner.

Interior

Through the main entrance at Georg-Coch-Platz the visitor ascends a flight of stairs to the grand Kassenhalle, where customer services are located. The main hall is thus effectively on the first floor. The hall is designed like an atrium, with a large glass skylight allowing natural light to enter the heart of the building at all times. Natural light is not used only for stylistic reasons, but also to reduce the cost of electric lighting. Even the floor of the main hall is constructed of glass tiles, allowing natural light to reach further down to the floor below, where the Post Office boxes and mail sorting rooms are located. Wagner kept decoration in the main hall minimal, using only glass and polished steel as materials. The decorative effect is created by the simple but elegant use of the material itself. The frosted glass skylight is pierced by steel columns, their slim design making them as unobstructive to the falling light as possible. The hall is one of Otto Wagner's famous works, and one of the finest examples of the Viennese Secession.

The building's office space is divided according to the axis of the outside windows, again making use of natural light as much as possible. The interior walls are non-load-bearing, and can therefore be re-arranged according to need, a feature that has become standard in modern office buildings.

Current state 
Spared any damage during World War II, the building is still in its original state and since 2005 includes a museum devoted to its creator, Otto Wagner.

References

Literature
 Otto Wagner. Die österreichische Postsparkasse. Falter Verlag, Wien. 1996. 
 Carl E. Schorske. Fin-de-Siècle Vienna: Politics and Culture. Vintage, London. 1980.

External links 

 Otto Wagner Museum located within the Austrian Postal Savings Bank
 Virtual tour through the building

Art Nouveau architecture in Vienna
Commercial buildings completed in 1906
Buildings and structures in Innere Stadt
Art Nouveau commercial buildings
Bank buildings in Austria
Otto Wagner buildings
1906 establishments in Austria
Postal savings system
20th-century architecture in Austria